Metopivaria is a genus of longhorn beetles of the subfamily Lamiinae, containing the following species:

 Metopivaria brunnea  (Aurivillius, 1923)
 Metopivaria elongata  (Breuning, 1976)

References

Homonoeini